Niels Henning van Steenis (born 3 November 1969 in Groningen) is a former rower from the Netherlands, who competed for his native country at the 1996 Summer Olympics in Atlanta, Georgia. There he won the gold medal with the Holland Acht (Holland Eights).

References
  Dutch Olympic Committee

1969 births
Living people
Dutch male rowers
Rowers at the 1996 Summer Olympics
Olympic rowers of the Netherlands
Olympic gold medalists for the Netherlands
Sportspeople from Groningen (city)
Olympic medalists in rowing
Medalists at the 1996 Summer Olympics